Sweet Revenge is a 1921 American short silent Western film directed by Edward Laemmle and featuring Hoot Gibson.

Cast
 Jim Corey
 Hoot Gibson
 Otto Nelson
 Gertrude Olmstead

See also
 Hoot Gibson filmography

External links
 

1921 films
1921 short films
1921 Western (genre) films
American silent short films
American black-and-white films
Films directed by Edward Laemmle
Silent American Western (genre) films
1920s American films
1920s English-language films